Jarchelu, also rendered as Jarchilu, may refer to:
 Jarchelu, Miandoab
 Jarchelu, Urmia